A Tutor for the Beaus: Or Love in a Labyrinth is a 1737 comedy play by the British writer John Hewitt. It drew inspiration from an earlier one-act play  Le Français à Londres by the French writer Louis de Boissy.

The original cast included James Rosco as Lord Manly, Benjamin Johnson as Sir Charles Freelove, Thomas Wright as Belville, William Giffard as Heatly, Henry Woodward as Young Manly and Anna Marcella Giffard as Pinup.

References

Bibliography
 Burling, William J. A Checklist of New Plays and Entertainments on the London Stage, 1700-1737. Fairleigh Dickinson Univ Press, 1992.
 Nicoll, Allardyce. A History of Early Eighteenth Century Drama: 1700-1750. CUP Archive, 1927.

1737 plays
British plays
Comedy plays
West End plays